The following table indicates the parties of elected officials in the U.S. state of Idaho:
Governor
Lieutenant Governor
Secretary of State
Attorney General
State Auditor/State Controller
State Treasurer
Superintendent of Public Instruction
Inspector of Mines (before 1974)

The table also indicates the historical party composition in the:
State Senate
State House of Representatives
State delegation to the United States Senate
State delegation to the United States House of Representatives

For years in which a presidential election was held, the table indicates which party's nominees received the state's electoral votes.

1863–1890

1890–1974

1975–present

See also
Politics in Idaho

References 

Politics of Idaho
Government of Idaho
Idaho